A synthetic measure (or synthetic indicator) is a value that is the result of combining other metrics, which are measurements of various features.

Examples

Quality of service 
There is a method to measure quality of service in hotels. In related study  authors aggregate tourist opinions, measured on a scale from 1 to 10. Synthetic measure (indicator) of service quality in each hotel is calculated with the help of the aggregation operator.

Project performance 
Other study proposed to use classical parameters EV, PV and AC to carry out the synthetic measure of project performance.

Rankings of countries 
Different normalized stimulants and destimulants were used in research to create synthetic measure that selects countries with the best and the worst levels of implementation of Europe 2020 targets.

References

External links 
 Scientific works about synthetic measure on Google Scholar

Computational statistics